Some 700 writers were contributors to the Dictionary of National Biography, in its first edition. They are listed below, in order of the name or initials they contributed under. Where they contributed under more than one signature, those are all given.

A–C

D

E

F

G

H–I

J

K–L

M–O

P–R

S–U
 
 
 
 
 
 
 
 
 
 
 
 
 
 
 
 
 
 
 
 
 
 
 
 
 
 
 
 
 
 
 
 
 
 
 
 
 
 
 
 
 
 
 
 
 
 
 
 
 
 
 
 
 
  volumes: 34 incomplete
  volumes: incomplete

W–Z
 
 
 
 
 
 
 
 
 
 
 
 
 
 
 
 
 
 
 
 
 
 
 
 
 
 
 
 
 
 
 
 
 
 
 
 
 
 
 
 
 
 
 
 
 
 
 
 
 
 
 
 
 
 
 
 
 
 
 
 
 
 
 
 
 
 
 
 
 
 
 
 
 

Lists of writers
Lists of British women